Watergate Halt was an intermediate halt on the initially privately run  North Devon and Cornwall Junction Light Railway.

"It was one of those moments you always remember – a first glimpse, caught through the dappled sunlight of a woodland glade. Deep within the heart of North Devon, I came across this tiny wayside halt, no longer than a single carriage length."

A remote rural station with one small siding used by a local farmer,  it was closed in 1965 and now forms part of the popular Tarka trail, a route for ramblers promoted by the local council.

See also
List of closed railway stations in Britain

References

External links
List of former West Country Halts
Last ever train

Disused railway stations in Devon
Former Southern Railway (UK) stations
Railway stations in Great Britain opened in 1926
Railway stations in Great Britain closed in 1965
1925 establishments in England
1965 disestablishments in England
Beeching closures in England
Torridge District